The Legislative Council of Manitoba was the upper house of the Legislature of Manitoba. Created in 1870 and abolished in 1876, the council was the only provincial upper house in Canada that was not a direct or indirect continuation of a pre-confederation upper house. It was also the first provincial upper house to be abolished.

History
The council was created under the provisions of the Manitoba Act. Even prior to Manitoba's entry into Confederation, the need for an upper house at the provincial level was seen to be questionable by many Canadians. However, the Francophone Métis population wanted to model the government in Manitoba on what had already been created for Quebec. There, the Legislative Council had been retained and was seen as a means to protect the interests of religious and linguistic minorities inside the province. In this, they easily gained the agreement of Prime Minister Sir John A. Macdonald, who firmly believed in the necessity of an unelected upper house.

During its brief existence, members of the Legislative Council were appointed by the lieutenant governor of Manitoba. However, by 1874, the new province's finances were in trouble, and the government had to appeal to Ottawa for aid. By this time, Macdonald had been replaced as prime minister by Alexander Mackenzie. Mackenzie's government agreed to provide aid, but demanded that the Legislative Council be eliminated as a cost-cutting measure. The council initially resisted, rejecting bills to abolish itself in 1874 and 1875. Finally in 1876, following the mediation of Lieutenant Governor Alexander Morris who had promised the recalcitrant councillors lucrative government positions elsewhere, the Legislative Council was abolished.

List of legislative councillors

See also
Legislative Council

References

External links 
Manitoba's Legislative Council Manitoba Pageant, Manitoba Historical Society

Defunct upper houses in Canada